Gustavo Carrer (21 May 1885 – 18 February 1968) was an Italian professional football player and manager who played as a forward.

He made his debut for the Italy national football team on 7 May 1911, scoring a goal in a 2–2 home draw against Switzerland. He collected another appearance for Italy against the same opponent later that year.

External links

 

1885 births
1968 deaths
Italian footballers
Italy international footballers
A.C. Milan players
Inter Milan players
Como 1907 players
S.S.D. Pro Sesto players
Italian football managers
Como 1907 managers

Association football forwards